Santi Simone e Giuda Taddeo a Torre Angela is a modern parish church and a titular church that can be assigned to cardinal priests in the papal diocese of Rome.

Church 
The church is dedicated to Saints Simon and Jude, apostles of Christ, located at Via di Torrenova 162.

It was built on 20 December 1992 for a parish that was established on 4 April 1961.

It enjoyed a papal visit from Pope John Paul II on 30 October 1988.

Cardinal priests 
 Pietro Parolin (22 February 2014 – present); co-opted to suburbicarian rank on 28 June 2018

References

External links 
 GCatholic cardinal title 
 GCatholic church 
 Diocesan website page, in Italian

 

Titular churches